Adgate is a surname. People with this surname include:

 Andrew Adgate (died 1793), American musician and author
 Asa Adgate (1767–1832), American iron manufacturer and congressman
 Cary Adgate (born 1953), American skier
 Chester Adgate Congdon (1853–1916), American lawyer and businessman

See also 
 Adgate Block, a historic building in Lima, Ohio, United States

References